Raúl H. Rodríguez (26 November 1915 – 1977) was an Argentine boxer who competed in the 1936 Summer Olympics. He was born in Córdoba. In 1936, Rodríguez was eliminated in the quarterfinals of the welterweight class after losing his fight to the upcoming bronze medalist Gerhard Pedersen.

References

External links

Raúl Rodríguez's profile at Sports Reference.com

1915 births
1977 deaths
Welterweight boxers
Olympic boxers of Argentina
Boxers at the 1936 Summer Olympics
Argentine male boxers
Sportspeople from Córdoba, Argentina